The men's decathlon competition at the 2001 Summer Universiade took place on 30 August and 31 August 2001 in Beijing, China.

Medalists

Records

Results

See also
2001 Decathlon Year Ranking
2001 World Championships in Athletics – Men's decathlon
2001 Hypo-Meeting

References

 decathlon2000

Decathlon
2001